Du Quoin is a city in Perry County, Illinois. It is best known for hosting the annual DuQuoin State Fair and the Street Machine Nationals. The population is estimated at 5,761 in the 2020 census.

Geography
Du Quoin is located at  (38.0068, -89.2349).

The city of Du Quoin is located in the southeastern portion of Perry County, Illinois.

Climate

History
The area east of Du Quoin is known as Old Du Quoin. In the early 19th century, Du Quoin was near the Lusk's Ferry Road, an important early road that connected Kaskaskia with Lusk's Ferry on the Ohio River. The road ran easterly out of Steeleville to a point southwest of Du Quoin. There it turned to the southeast to cross the Big Muddy River and head for Lusk's Ferry.

Du Quoin had its start at its present location in 1853 when the railroad was extended to that point. The city was named after Chief Jean Baptiste Ducoigne of the Kaskaskia, an Illiniwek people, who were defeated by the Shawnee near here in 1802.

Media
Du Quoin is served by a weekly newspaper, the Weekly-Press. Du Quoin is also served by radio stations WDQN AM 1580/FM 97.1 and WDQN-FM 95.9 FM.  A former daily newspaper, the Du Quoin Call, was published from 1895 until 2022.

Rail transportation

Amtrak, the national passenger rail system, provides service to Du Quoin. Amtrak Train 391, the southbound Saluki, is scheduled to depart Du Quoin at 1:49 pm daily with service to Carbondale. Amtrak Train 393, the southbound Illini, is scheduled to depart Du Quoin at 8:39 pm daily serving the same point as the southbound Saluki. Amtrak Train 390, the northbound Saluki, is scheduled to depart Du Quoin at 7:51 am daily with service to Centralia, Effingham, Mattoon, Champaign-Urbana, Rantoul, Gilman, Kankakee, Homewood, and Chicago. Amtrak Train 392, the northbound Illini, is scheduled to depart Du Quoin at 4:26 pm daily serving the same points as the northbound Saluki.

Demographics

As of the census of 2000, there were 6,448 people, 2,716 households, and 1,648 families residing in the city. The racial makeup of the city was 90.23% White, 7.23% African American, 0.36% Native American, 0.34% Asian, 0.05% Pacific Islander, 0.36% from other races, and 1.44% from two or more races. Hispanic or Latino of any race were 1.32% of the population.

There were 2,716 households, out of which 28.0% had children under the age of 18 living with them, 45.0% were married couples living together, 12.4% had a female householder with no husband present, and 39.3% were non-families. 35.6% of all households were made up of individuals, and 19.9% had someone living alone who was 65 years of age or older. The average household size was 2.26 and the average family size was 2.92.

In the city, the population was spread out, with 23.5% under the age of 18, 10.2% from 18 to 24, 24.9% from 25 to 44, 20.7% from 45 to 64, and 20.8% who were 65 years of age or older. The median age was 39 years. For every 100 females, there were 89.4 males. For every 100 females age 18 and over, there were 84.8 males.

The median income for a household in the city was $29,124, and the median income for a family was $37,688. Males had a median income of $33,576 versus $18,958 for females. The per capita income for the city was $14,883. About 13.3% of families and 18.1% of the population were below the poverty line, including 22.6% of those under age 18 and 12.1% of those age 65 or over.

Medical care 
Du Quoin is home to Marshall Browning Hospital, a 25-bed critical access facility, and two nursing homes. The nearest ICU is 25 miles away, at Memorial Hospital of Carbondale.

Events 
The DuQuoin State Fair is held in late August and early September since 1923. The DuQuoin State Fairgrounds Racetrack has hosted different types of racing. It hosted a AAA National Championship race from 1948 to 1955, and a USAC National Championship race from 1955 to 1970. It currently hosts a USAC Silver Crown Series race and a ARCA Menards Series race. From 1957 to 1980, Du Quoin was home to the Hambletonian Stakes, one of the most famous events in harness racing, and one of three races comprising the Triple Crown of Harness Racing for Trotters. Du Quoin now is best known for Street Machines Nationals and the Du Quoin State Fair.

Notable people 

 Terry Deering, Illinois legislator; born in Du Quoin
 Ralph A. Dunn, businessman and Illinois state legislator
 Ruby Berkley Goodwin, writer and actress, born in Du Quoin
 Frank Hansford, pitcher for the Brooklyn Bridegrooms; born in Du Quoin
 Gerald Hawkins, Illinois legislator; born in Du Quoin
 Billie Hayes, actress (Witchiepoo in H.R. Pufnstuf, Mammy Yoakam in Li'l Abner); born in Du Quoin
 Nick Hill, football quarterback and head coach at Southern Illinois; born in Du Quoin
 Les Hite, musician and bandleader; born in Du Quoin
 Bhavesh Patel, theatre and television actor; lived in Du Quoin
 Tyler Reddick, NASCAR Cup Series driver; lived in Du Quoin
 Don Stanhouse, pitcher with the Texas Rangers, Montreal Expos, Baltimore Orioles, and Los Angeles Dodgers; born in Du Quoin
 Ken Swofford, actor (Thelma & Louise, Ellery Queen); born in Du Quoin
 Rudolf Wanderone, billiards player known as "Minnesota Fats"; lived in Du Quoin
 John Iffert, Roman Catholic Bishop of the Diocese of Covington.

References

External links

 City of Du Quoin

Cities in Illinois
Populated places in Southern Illinois
Cities in Perry County, Illinois
Populated places established in 1853
1853 establishments in Illinois